The Azerbaijan women's national field hockey team represents Azerbaijan in international women's field hockey and is controlled by the Azerbaijan Field Hockey Federation, the governing body for field hockey in Azerbaijan.

The national team hasn't participated in any international competitions since November 2016 because the national association was suspended on 12 November 2016.

Tournament records

European Championships
 2003 – 9th place
 2007 – 5th place
 2009 – 6th place
 2011 – 7th place

World League
 2012–14 – 20th place

Champions Challenge
 2007 – 6th place
 2009 – 7th place
 2011 – 8th place

References

European women's national field hockey teams
field hockey
National team